Onchidella celtica is a species of air-breathing sea slug, a shell-less marine pulmonate gastropod mollusk in the family Onchidiidae.

The complete nucleotide sequence of the mitochondrial genome of Onchidella celtica has been available since 2008.

Description
Onchidella celtica is up to 12mm long and its oval body has a deep olive to black colour. The mantle is covered with large tubercles which concealed the head and the foot of the animal when motionless. The eyes are at the tips of two short and thick tentacles and are visible from above when the animal is crawling.

Distribution
This species occurs locally on the East Atlantic coastline, from western Scotland, western England and the Channel Islands, south to Spain and the Azores, including:
 Great Britain
Coastline of Brittany

Habitat 
This air-breathing sea slug lives in the intertidal zone on rocky shorelines. It is exposed on rocky shores at low tides and retreats to crevices when the tide rises.

References

 Dayrat, Benoît 2009, Review of the current knowledge of the systematics of Onchidiidae (Mollusca: Gastropoda: Pulmonata) with a checklist of nominal species. Zootaxa 2068: 1–26.

External links
 "Species summary for Onchidella  celtica" Animalbase
 "Celtic sea slug - Onchidella celtica" MarLIN
 Sea Slug Forum
 Sea Nature Studies : Onchidella celtica

Onchidiidae
Gastropods described in 1817
Taxa named by Georges Cuvier